is a JR West railway station located in Shimonoseki, Yamaguchi Prefecture, Japan.

Railway stations in Japan opened in 1914
Railway stations in Yamaguchi Prefecture
Sanin Main Line
Stations of West Japan Railway Company